"Only You (Can Break My Heart)" is a 1965 single by Buck Owens. The song was Owens's seventh number one in a row on the U.S. country singles chart. It spent one week at the top of the chart and a total of seventeen weeks.  The B-side, "Gonna Have Love", peaked at number ten on the country chart.

Chart performance

References

Buck Owens songs
1965 songs
1965 singles
Songs written by Buck Owens
Song recordings produced by Ken Nelson (American record producer)
Capitol Records singles